Brettin is a village and a former municipality in the Jerichower Land district, in Saxony-Anhalt, Germany. Since 1 January 2010, it is part of the town Jerichow.

Former municipalities in Saxony-Anhalt
Jerichow